{{Infobox football league
| name                 = Central Midlands Football League
| image                = CMLLogo.jpg
| pixels               = 150
| country              = England
| confed               = 
| founded              = 1983
| folded               = 
| divisions            = 
| teams                = 5915 (North Division)16 (South Division)9 (Division One North)9 (Division One South)10 (Division One Central)
| feeds                = 
| promotion            = Northern Counties East League Division OneUnited Counties League Division One
| relegation           = 
| levels               = 11th (North and South Divisions)
| domest_cup           = League Challenge Cup
| confed_cup           = 
| champions            = None (2019–20 and 2020–21 seasons abandoned owing to COVID-19 pandemic)
| season               = 
| most successful club = Hucknall Town (3 Times, 1990, 1991 and 2019)
| sponsorship_name     = 
| tv                   = 
| website              = Pitchero
| current              = 
}}
The Central Midlands Football League is an English football league covering the northeast-central part of England. Formed in 1971 as the South Derbyshire League, changing name initially to the Derbyshire League before changing to its current name in 1983, it covers parts of Derbyshire, Lincolnshire, Nottinghamshire and South Yorkshire. The league's current sponsor is Abacus Lighting. The number of divisions has varied over time as follows 

1983–84: Premier, Premier First, Senior and First
1984–85 to 1985–86: Premier, Central, Senior and First
1986–87 to 1987–88: Supreme, Premier, First and Second
1988–89 to 1990–91: Supreme, Premier and First
1991–92: Supreme, Premier North and Premier South
1992–93 to 2010–11: Supreme and Premier
2011–12 to 2012-13: North and South
2012–13 to 2014-15: North, South, Reserve Supreme and Reserve Premier
2015-16 to 2016-17: North, South, Reserve Division
2017-18 to 2018-19: North, South, Reserve Supreme and Division One
2018–19 to 2019-20: North, South, Division One North and South
2019-20 to Present: North, South, Division One North, South and Central

Within the English football league system, the Central Midlands League's top two divisions, called the North Division and South Division'', were considered part of the National League System (at Step 7) until 2020, when they were redesignated as NLS county feeders. Four clubs from the previously-named Premier Division had the distinction of being the lowest-ranked clubs, and only ones outside the NLS, accepted for the 2006–07 FA Vase. For the 2008–09 season, eight of the leading sides left the Central Midlands League to join forces with eight clubs from the Leicestershire Senior League to form a new league, the East Midlands Counties League, at Step 6 of the National League System. For the 2015–16 season reserve teams of clubs who play higher up the pyramid were allowed to participate in the league for the first time.

Champions of the North Division are eligible (if they meet ground standards) for promotion to the Northern Counties East League Division One and champions of the South Division are eligible for promotion to the United Counties League and until 2019, East Midlands Counties League, and some clubs have progressed from the CML to the National League North and Northern Premier League. A representative side from the league takes part in the FA Inter-League Cup.

Local leagues below the Central Midlands League on the pyramid include the Midlands Regional Alliance. In most cases these have multiple divisions or feeder leagues of their own.

At the 2017 AGM it was agreed for the Reserve Division to become Division One and confirmed the new teams which would join the league for the forthcoming season. The North Division welcomed Lincoln Moorlands Railway, Staveley Miners Welfare Reserves (promoted from Reserve Division), and Renishaw Rangers, the South Division welcomed Hilton Harriers, AFC Kilburn and Aslockton & Orston.

Current members
The member clubs of the league for the 2022–23 season are as follows:

North Division
AFC Bentley
AFC Phoenix
Bakewell Town
Club Thorne Colliery
Collingham
Dearne and District
Dinnington Town
Glapwell
Harworth Colliery
Hatfield Town
Kiveton Miners Welfare
Retford United
St Josephs Rockware of Worksop
Staveley Miners Welfare Reserves
Yorkshire Main

South Division
Arnold Town
Ashland Rovers
Clay Cross Town
Cromford & Wirksworth Town
Derby Singh Brothers
Graham Street Prims
Holbrook St Michaels
Linby Colliery Welfare
Mansfield Hosiery Mills
Mickleover reserves
Mickleover Royal British Legion
Nottingham FC
Pinxton
South Normanton Athletic
Teversal
Wirksworth Ivanhoe

Division One North
780 JLC
Bessacarr
Bottesford Town Development
Crowle Colts Development
Dearne & District Development
Doncaster Elite
Harworth Colliery Reserves
Hatfield Town Development
North of England Academy
Retford FC Development
Sheffield FC Development
Worksop Town Reserves

Division One East
AFC Normanton
Ashland Rovers Reserves
Blidworth Welfare Reserves
Clipstone Reserves
Linby Colliery Reserves
Long Bennington
Mansfield Hosiery Mills Reserves
Nottingham FC Reserves
Ollerton Town Development
Pass Move Grin
RHP Newark
Teversal Reserves
Woodhouse Colts

Division One West
Belper United Reserves
Castle Donington
Heanor Town Reserves
Holbrook Angels
Holbrook St Michaels Reserves
Kilburn
Little Eaton
Mayfield
Melbourne Dynamo
Mickleover RBL Reserves
Rowsley 86
South Normanton Athletic Reserves

League champions

League Challenge Cup
The league also runs the Central Midlands League Challenge Cup, which is contested by every club in the league.
Since 2001 every final has been played at Alfreton Town's North Street stadium.

Finals

References

External links
North Division current table at NonLeagueMatters
South division current table at NonLeagueMatters
Central Midlands League on Mitoo (to 2012–13)
Central Midlands League on FA Full-Time (2013–14 onwards)

 
1971 establishments in England
Football leagues in England
Sports leagues established in 1971